Chrysochus cobaltinus, the cobalt milkweed beetle or blue milkweed beetle, is a member of the diverse family leaf beetles (Chrysomelidae). It occurs in the Western United States and British Columbia.

Appearance
C. cobaltinus has an iridescent cobalt-blue exoskeleton. The elytra usually have more or less evident epipleura, changing within the varying species within the Chrysomelidae. It rarely has an exposed pygidium. The body is oval, although the ventral is not prominently convex.

Behavior
C. cobaltinus is similar to click beetles in being able to launch themselves a couple times the length of their body.

Both adults and larvae feed on dogbane (Apocynum) and milkweed (Asclepias) species. Adults typically feed on the foliage and flowers of the newly-developed plant. When a large community appears, they consume a large portion of the leaf tissue from the plant, which causes significant damage to the plant. The adults eat holes in the leaves of the host plant, appearing in spring as the days become warmer and the plant's leaves begin to develop. During the spring they disperse in large numbers on various plants within the same area of distribution.

Life cycle

Adults emerge in early summer and persist on milkweed plants in patches for approximately six weeks. Females are highly polyandrous; males engage in extended periods of post-copulatory mate guarding.

The adult females lay their eggs on the leaves of dogbane and milkweed plants; the larva consumes the leaf tissue between the veins, leaving nothing but a skeleton. On occasion the larva also eats the root system of the plant. C. cobaltinus larvae in large numbers can consume all the plant's leaves. This apparently does not kill the plant; it goes dormant until the following year, although if the larvae consume the root system of the plant, it will eventually wither away.

Range
C. cobaltinus ranges in High Plains from British Columbia south through Washington, Idaho, Montana, Oregon, California, Nevada, Utah, and Colorado to Arizona and New Mexico. East of the Rocky Mountains, the species is replaced by Chrysochus auratus. Historically, the two species were considered to have allopatric distributions. Recently, at least two narrow regions in western North America have been documented where both C. auratus and C. cobaltinus occur and apparently interbreed.

References

 Texas Beetle Information
 
 
 http://esa.confex.com/esa/2004/techprogram/paper_15339.htm
 https://web.archive.org/web/20100704170402/http://waynesword.palomar.edu/ww0502.htm
 http://www.geog.ubc.ca/biodiversity/efauna/FamiliesofColeopteraofBritishColumbia.html
 https://web.archive.org/web/20110720112837/http://share3.esd105.wednet.edu/rsandelin/fieldguide/Animalpages/Insects/Beetles.htm
 http://www.buzzle.com/articles/types-of-beetles.html

Eumolpinae
Beetles of North America
Beetles described in 1857
Taxa named by John Lawrence LeConte